The 1971 South Carolina Gamecocks football team represented the University of South Carolina as an independent in the 1971 NCAA University Division football season. Led by sixth-year head coach Paul Dietzel, the Gamecocks compiled a record of 6–5. The team played home games at Carolina Stadium in Columbia, South Carolina.

After competing in the Atlantic Coast Conference (ACC) from its founding in 1953 through the spring of 1971, South Carolina withdrew due to a disagreement with the ACC's desire to strengthen its academic requirements. The Gamecocks honored existing contracts with the seven remaining ACC schools for the 1971 season.

Schedule

Roster

References

South Carolina
South Carolina Gamecocks football seasons
South Carolina Gamecocks football